This is a list of the number-one albums of the Specialist Classical Albums Chart during the 2020s.

Number ones

By artist
, five artists have spent six or more weeks at the top of the Specialist Classical Albums Chart so far during the 2020s. The totals below include only credited performances.

By record label
, Sixteen record labels have released chart-topping albums so far during the 2020s.

See also

List of UK Albums Chart number ones of the 2020s

References

External links
Specialist Classical Albums Top 20 at the Official Charts Company

2020s in British music
United Kingdom Specialist Classical Albums
Specialist Classical
2020s-related lists
 List 2020